Møre Arbeiderblad was a Norwegian newspaper, published in Ålesund in Møre og Romsdal county.

Møre Arbeiderblad was started on 13 September 1923 as a newspaper with an unofficial affiliation with the Labour Party. Before the affiliation was made formal, the Communist Party broke away from Labour and took Møre Arbeiderblad with them. It was their organ for Sunnmøre.

Well-known editors include Ålesund native Reinert Torgeirson from 1924 to 1925 and Jens Galaaen from 1925 to 1929. The newspaper came once a week, except a period from early 1924 to mid-1929 when it came twice a week. It went defunct after its last issue on 28 March 1931. Møre Arbeiderblad did resurface later, but the details around that are shadowy.

References

1923 establishments in Norway
1931 disestablishments in Norway
Ålesund
Communist Party of Norway newspapers
Defunct newspapers published in Norway
Labour Party (Norway) newspapers
Mass media in Møre og Romsdal
Norwegian-language newspapers
Publications established in 1923
Publications disestablished in 1931